José Mari Martínez was a Filipino sports executive who served as President of the Philippine Football Federation and a Philippine international footballer.

Football career
Martinez was a player for the Philippine national team. He was one of the three goalscorers in the Philippines' first official FIFA win, a 3–0 win over Republic of China (now playing as Chinese Taipei) in the Asian qualifiers for the 1972 Summer Olympics At the youth level, Martinez, also played for the San Beda College in the National Collegiate Athletic Association. In 2004, he was given an outstanding player award along with Miguel Crame by the Philippine Football Federation, with the two being prominent footballers of the 1970s.

Scores and results list the Philippines' goal tally first.

President of the Philippine Football Federation

2007 leadership dispute
In 2007, Martinez's first year as President of the Philippine Football Federation, there was an attempt to remove Martinez from office. This move was viewed as a bribe by critics of Martinez.

PFF House of Football in Pasig
On August 2, 2008, the PFF's new headquarters, the PFF House of Football, was inaugurated by then FIFA President Sepp Blatter and AFC President bin Hammam in Barangay Oranbo, Pasig. The PFF moved to the building after occupying the PhilSports Complex as its headquarters for decades.

2009 national teams crisis
In 2009, a crisis affected the Philippine women's national futsal and men's senior teams which saw the ouster of women's futsal coach Emmanuel Batungbacal and long-time men's national football coach Juan Cutillas. Batungbacal was sacked by the PFF under recommendation from PFF Futsal Committee chairman Esmaeil Sedigh, from his position for sending an unsanctioned squad to futsal competition in New Zealand. Batungbacal described the move as "ironic" and showed documents to the media showing that the PFF indeed sanctioned his squad. He also accused Martinez of ignoring his pleas to express his concerns regarding the matter. The players who played under Batungbacal resigned from international duty as protests. Martinez said that Batungbacal was sacked due to lack of a coaching license and denied accusations that he ignored Batungbacal saying a dialogue between them already took place.

Ouster in 2010
Martinez was accused and charged in court for falsifying public documents particularly when he notarized a Secretary's Certification with an individual by the name of Henry Tsai included as one of the signatories to the account of the federation in Banco de Oro and Bank of the Philippine Islands even if there was no motion to include Tsai as a signatory. Tsai was a former co-worker of Martinez at Soriamont Steamship Agencies, who was also named Managing Consultant of the PFF and later Executive Vice President.

Martinez said that he made a mistake of making Tsai as Executive Vice President of the PFF and entrusting the latter of funds of the federation. He accused the Tsai who went into hiding of taking away funds after hiring auditing firms to look on the PFF's books of accounts. He maintained to critics within the federation that he did not misuse any funds and will not resign from his post.

On November 27, 2010, at the PFF 7th Ordinary Congress at the PhilSports Complex in Pasig, Martinez was ousted by 25 Presidents out of the 29 present member associations to approve a resolution made by 8 members of the Board of Governors calling for the ousting and replacement of Martinez as PFF president. Mariano Araneta was named Interim President.

References

Filipino footballers
Philippines international footballers
Presidents of the Philippine Football Federation
Association footballers not categorized by position
Year of birth missing